Spinicalliotropis is a genus of sea snail, a marine gastropod mollusk in the family Eucyclidae.

Species
 Spinicalliotropis chalkeie (Vilvens, 2007)
 Spinicalliotropis ericius (Vilvens, 2006)
 Spinicalliotropis lamellifera (Jansen, 1994)
 Spinicalliotropis solariellaformis Vilvens, 2006
 Spinicalliotropis spinosa (Poppe, Tagaro & Dekker, 2006)
 Spinicalliotropis stephanos Vilvens, 2021

References

 Poppe G.T., Tagaro S.P. & Dekker H. (2006) The Seguenziidae, Chilodontidae, Trochidae, Calliostomatidae and Solariellidae of the Philippine Islands. Visaya Supplement 2: 1-228.

External links
 Worms Link
 Kano, Y.; Chikyu, E.; Warén, A. (2009). Morphological, ecological and molecular characterization of the enigmatic planispiral snail genus Adeuomphalus (Vetigastropoda: Seguenzioidea. Journal of Molluscan Studies. 75(4): 397-418.

 
Eucyclidae
Gastropod genera